Wanji, or Vwanji, is a Bantu language of Tanzania.

Writing system

References

Languages of Tanzania
Northeast Bantu languages